The men's basketball team of the University of North Carolina at Chapel Hill is referred to as the North Carolina Tar Heels, and they play in Division I of the National Collegiate Athletic Association (NCAA) in the Atlantic Coast Conference (ACC).  The Tar Heels have played their games at the Dean Smith Center in Chapel Hill, North Carolina since 1986.

As of the 2009–10 season, North Carolina had the second most wins and the second highest winning percentage of any NCAA Division I men's team with a record of 2,004 wins and 720 losses over 100 seasons. The Tar Heels also have the most consecutive 20-win seasons, with 31 seasons from the 1970–71 season through 2000–01 season. The Tar Heels have won the NCAA Division I men's basketball tournament six times, have appeared in the tournament finals eleven times, a record 21 NCAA Final Fours, have made it into the NCAA tournament 47 times (tied for second-most all-time), and hold the record for all-time NCAA tournament victories (102).
Additionally, the team has been the number one seed in the NCAA tournament 13 times, which is the most #1 seeds of all-time, and has been ranked in the top 25 AP Poll 703 times (1st all-time), has beaten #1 teams a record 12 times, has the most consecutive 20-win seasons, with 31, North Carolina has also won the National Invitation Tournament, appeared in two NIT Semifinals, and has made five appearances in the NIT Tournament. North Carolina has had a top twenty-five final ranking among Division I schools 42 times as ranked by the Associated Press and 44 times as ranked by the Coaches Poll.  In five instances the Tar Heels have ended the season with a number one ranking in the Associated Press, and the Tar Heels have also been ranked number one five times at the end of the season by the Coaches' Poll.

The Tar Heels played their first basketball game against Virginia Christian, on January 27, 1910, a 42–21 win for North Carolina.  In 1921 North Carolina joined the Southern Conference.  In the Southern Conference, the Tar Heels quickly found success. The 1923–24 Tar Heels squad went 26-0 and was retroactively awarded the national championship by the Helms Athletic Foundation in 1936. Overall, the Tar Heels played 32 seasons in the Southern Conference from 1921 to 1953.  During that period they won 304 games and lost 111 for a winning percentage of 73.3%.  The Tar Heels were winners of the regular season for nine times and won the Southern Conference Championships 8 times.
 
In 1953, North Carolina split off from the Southern Conference and became a founding member of the Atlantic Coast Conference.  Again, the Tar Heels quickly found success in their new conference. The Tar Heels won their first NCAA Championship under coach Frank McGuire in 1957, which was led by Lennie Rosenbluth and several other transplants from the New York City area.  McGuire was forced to resign in 1961 after an NCAA violation regarding "improper recruiting entertainment" and was replaced by one of his assistants, Dean Smith.

Smith coached the Tar Heels from 1961 to 1997 and brought an unprecedented level of success to the team.  When Smith retired in 1997, he had the most wins ever of any NCAA Division I men's basketball coach with 879 wins, and the 9th highest winning percentage with 77.6% wins. During Smith's time as head coach, North Carolina won the ACC regular season championship 17 times, won the ACC tournament 13 times, won the NIT in 1971, went to the NCAA tournament 27 times, appeared in 11 final fours, and won two NCAA national tournament titles, in 1982 and 1993. The 1982 National Championship team was led by James Worthy, Sam Perkins, and a young Michael Jordan. The 1993 National Championship team starred Donald Williams, George Lynch and Eric Montross.  While at North Carolina, Smith helped promote desegregation by recruiting the university's first African American scholarship basketball player Charlie Scott.

Smith retired in 1997 and the head coaching position went to his assistant Bill Guthridge. In his three seasons as head coach Guthridge led the Tar Heels to the NCAA final Four twice, in the 1998 tournament and again in the 2000 tournament.

Guthridge retired in 2000 and North Carolina turned to the 38-year-old Matt Doherty to lead the Tar Heels. Doherty had mixed success while at Carolina.  In his first season, the Heels shot to the #1 ranking in the polls in the middle of the Atlantic Coast Conference schedule and finished with an impressive 26–7 record. But Doherty's second season was the worst in recent history as the Tar Heels finished the season with a record of 8-20, missing postseason play entirely for the first time since the 1965–66 season (including a record 26 straight NCAA Tournament appearances) and finishing with a losing record for the first time since 1962 (Dean Smith's first year as coach). They also finished 4–12 in the ACC—only the program's second losing ACC record ever. The 12 losses were six more than the Tar Heels had ever suffered in a single season of ACC play, and placed them in a tie for 7th place—the program's first finish below fourth place ever. The season also saw the end of UNC's run of 31 straight 20-win seasons and 35 straight seasons of finishing third or higher in the ACC.  After bringing in one of the top 5 incoming classes for the 2002–03 season, the Tar Heels started the season by knocking off a top 5 Kansas team and going on to win the Preseason NIT and returning to the AP top 25. Carolina went on to finish the season with a 17–15 record, barely missing the NCAA tournament. Matt Doherty led the Tar Heels to the third round of the NIT where they ended their season with a loss to Georgetown. Despite the turnaround from the year before and the late season playoff run, at the end of the season Matt Doherty was replaced as head coach by Roy Williams.

Roy Williams' first season was a moderate success with North Carolina finished 19-11 and the team was knocked out in the second round of the NCAA tournament by Texas.  Williams was able to gain more success in his second season and coached North Carolina to a National Championship in 2005.  After winning the championship, Williams had to deal with the departure of the team's top seven scorers.  Most thought that 2005–06 would be a down season for Williams, but the Tar Heels proved to be surprisingly successful in part due to the help of the freshman Tyler Hansbrough.  Williams was named Coach of the Year for his ability to turn around such a new team to such a high level of success.  Since 2005 the Tar Heels have once again become a leader in the ACC, winning both the regular season and the conference tournament in 2006–07 and 2007–08.  In the 2008–09 season, North Carolina was chosen as consensus pre-season #1 and managed to fulfill the predictions of a national championship by beating Michigan State in the 2009 National Championship.  However, the 2009-10 season ended up being a down season for the Tar Heels.  The loss of players such as Ty Lawson and Tyler Hansbrough, along with numerous injuries to key players, proved too much to overcome and resulted in the Tar Heels missing the NCAA tournament for the first time since the 2002–03 season.  The Tar Heels returned to the NCAA tournament in the ensuring years losing to Kentucky and Kansas in the Elite 8 during the 2010-11 and 2011-12 seasons respectively.  In the 2015-16 season, Williams returned the Tar Heels to the NCAA Championship game where he sought his third National Championship against Villanova.  Marcus Paige hit an off-balance three-point shot to tie the game with 4.7 seconds left.  However, Villanova's Kris Jenkins hit a buzzer-beating three pointer to defeat the Tar Heels 77–74.  The Tar Heels returned to the 2017 National Championship game the following year where they defeated Gonzaga 71–65 to win their sixth NCAA title in program history.

Season results

Postseason playoff results
The NCAA tournament started in 1939 and the number of teams invited to participate has expanded a number of times over the years. Between 1939 and 1950 the tournament had only eight teams, and then between 1951 and 1974 the tournament varied between 16 teams and 25 teams.  The tournament has continued to expand over the years, and there are now 68 teams that make it into the tournament.

The National Invitation Tournament, meanwhile, began in 1938 with only 6 teams.  In 1941 the tournament was expanded to include 8 teams, in 1949 the tournament was again expanded to 12 teams, then 14 teams in 1965, 16 teams in 1968, 24 teams in 1979, 32 teams in 1980, and 40 teams from 2002 through 2006. The tournament reverted to 32 teams for 2007.

References
General
 

Specific

External links
Official North Carolina Tar Heels men's basketball website

 
North Carolina Tar Heels
North Carolina Tar Heels basketball seasons